The Nakaya Islands are a small group of islands in Crystal Sound, about 18 km northeast of Cape Rey, Graham Land in Antarctica. They were named by United Kingdom Antarctic Place-Names Committee (UK-APC) after Ukichiro Nakaya (1900–62), a Japanese Professor of Physics from the University of Hokkaido, who specialized in the field of investigating the structure of ice crystals and snowflakes.

Surveying & Mapping

The islands were photographed from the air by Falkland Islands and Dependencies Aerial Survey Expedition (FIDASE) from 1956–57 and then mapped from surveys by Falkland Islands Dependencies Survey (FIDS) (1958–59).

Flora & Fauna
Various flora and fauna live around the islands such as penguins, krill, Petrels and Mosses.

See also 
 List of Antarctic and sub-Antarctic islands

References

Islands of Graham Land
Loubet Coast